Bill May (born October 2, 1974) is a retired American soccer goalkeeper who played professionally in the USL A-League.

Player

Youth
May graduated from Moreau Catholic High School.  He then attended the University of Washington, playing on the men's soccer team from 1993 to 1997.  He reshirted his freshman season.

Professional
In 1994, May played for the Santa Cruz Surf of the USISL during the collegiate off-season.  In 1996, he played for the Spokane Shadow and in 1997 with the Puget Sound BigFoot, both also in the USISL.  On February 1, 1998, the Tampa Bay Mutiny selected May in the third round (thirty-first overall) of the 1998 MLS College Draft.  On March 1, 1998, the Mutiny waived May.  He then signed with the San Francisco Seals of the USL A-League.  In April 1998, he was called up by the San Jose Clash of Major League Soccer.  In 1999, the Seals traded May to the Seattle Sounders in exchange for Ryan Edwards.  He gained his first game with the Sounders in August 1999, after Preston Burpo injured his shoulder.  He played six games in 1999 and twenty in 2000. He was called up to the Los Angeles Galaxy in October 1999. On February 26, 2001, May announced his retirement from playing.

Coach
May has an extensive youth soccer coaching resume.  From 1999 to 2004, he served as an assistant coach with the University of Washington men's soccer team.

References

External links
 
 

1974 births
Living people
American soccer coaches
American soccer players
Everett BigFoot players
San Francisco Seals (soccer) players
Santa Cruz Surf players
Spokane Shadow players
Seattle Sounders (1994–2008) players
USISL players
A-League (1995–2004) players
Washington Huskies men's soccer players
Soccer players from California
San Jose Earthquakes players
LA Galaxy players
Tampa Bay Mutiny draft picks
Association football goalkeepers
People from Castro Valley, California
Sportspeople from Castro Valley, California